CSS Colonel Lovell was a cotton-clad ram ship of the Confederate States Navy during the American Civil War

Service history
The ship was built in Cincinnati, Ohio, in 1843, as Hercules, and was owned by the Ocean Towing Co. of New Orleans. She was taken over in 1861 by General Mansfield Lovell, commanding the New Orleans military district, and converted to a cottonclad ram by installation of double pine bulwarks filled with compressed cotton and one-inch iron plates on each bow. She operated under the direction of the Confederate War Department and was attached to the Mississippi River Defense Fleet, commanded by Commodore J. E. Montgomery, a former river steamboat captain.

Battle of Plum Point Bend
On 10 May 1862, while operating off Fort Pillow, Tennessee, in defense of the river approaches to Memphis, Colonel Lovell, in company with seven of Montgomery's vessels, attacked the ironclad gunboats of the Federal Mississippi Flotilla. The action of Plum Point Bend which followed witnessed successful ramming tactics by the Confederates, though each of their vessels mounted at least four 8-inch guns. Later, Montgomery's force held off the Federal rams and gunboats until Fort Pillow was successfully evacuated on 1 June, and the Confederate rams fell back on Memphis to take on coal.

Battle of Memphis
Following the Federal capture of Fort Pillow Flag Officer Charles Henry Davis, USN, commanding the Mississippi Flotilla, pressed on without delay and appeared off Memphis with superior force on 6 June 1862. Included in his force were two of the Federal Army's rams, commanded by Colonel Charles Ellet, Jr. Montgomery, unwilling to retreat to Vicksburg because of his shortage of fuel and unwilling to destroy his boats, determined to fight against heavy odds. In the engagement that followed, one of Colonel Lovells engines malfunctioned and she became unmanageable. Colonel Lovell sank in deep water in the middle of the river. Capt. J. C. Delancy and a number of his crew were able to swim ashore.

References
 

Cottonclad rams of the Confederate States Navy
Shipwrecks of the Mississippi River
Shipwrecks of the American Civil War
Ships sunk in collisions
Ships built in Cincinnati
1843 ships
Maritime incidents in June 1862